Adrian Michael Meyer (born 22 September 1970) is an English former professional footballer who played as a central defender. He played for Scarborough and VS Rugby.

References

1970 births
Living people
English footballers
People from Yate
Sportspeople from Gloucestershire
Association football central defenders
Scarborough F.C. players
Rugby Town F.C. players
English Football League players